This is a discography of the German singer Mark Medlock.

Albums

Studio albums

Compilations
2008: Album Collection (Box set compilation)
2013: Mr. Lonely / Dreamcatcher
2015: Best Of

Remixes
2011: Der Hit-Mix

Video albums
2008: Live in Offenbach
2008: Cloud Dancer (Deluxe-Edition)
2011: My World (Deluxe-Edition)

EPs
2008: Famous 5: Mark Medlock

Singles

Collaborative Singles

Other songs
2013: "Car Wash"
2017: "In Love with a Ghost"
2017: "When the Rain Comes"

Music videos

References

Medlock, Mark